Assorted Gems (lit. Jewel Bibimbap) is a 2009 South Korean television series starring Go Na-eun, Lee Tae-gon, So Yi-hyun, Lee Hyun-jin, and Lee Il-min. It aired on MBC from 5 September 2009 to 21 February 2010.

Synopsis
The family drama Assorted Gems revolves around four siblings of the Gung family. All are named after precious jewels: eldest daughter, Bi-chwi (Jade), eldest son San-ho (Coral), second daughter Ryu-bi (Ruby), and younger son Ho-bak (Amber).

Bi-chwi and Ruby are two pretty but shallow women who wish to marry rich men to live comfortable lives. San-ho's goal is to pass the bar exam and gain wealth and status as a prosecutor, and Ho-bak is always getting into fistfights.

Their various personalities and differences lead to conflicts within the family and in their love lives.

Cast and characters
Gung family
 Go Na-eun as Gung Bi-chwi (Jade)
 So Yi-hyun as Gung Ryu-bi (Ruby)
 Lee Hyun-jin as Gung San-ho (Coral)
 Lee Il-min as Gung Ho-bak (Amber)
 Recipon Leo as Gung Tae-ja (Prince, youngest son of Sang-shik and Hye-ja)
 Han Jin-hee as Gung Sang-shik, father
 Han Hye-sook as Pi Hye-ja, mother
 Kim Young-ok as Kyul Myung-ja, Sang-shik's mother
 Jung Hye-sun as Baek Jo, Hye-ja's mother

Seo family
 Lee Tae-gon as Seo Young-guk
 Lee Ah-jin as Seo Kkeut-soon, sister
 Park Geun-hyung as Seo Ro-ma, father
 Hong Yoo-jin as Lee Tae-ri, mother

Supporting cast
 Michael Blunck as Kyle Huntington
 Jeong Yu-mi as Lee Kang-ji
 Seo Woo-rim as Boss ("Sajang")
 Yoon Jong-hwa as Yoo Byung-hoon, doctor and Ryu-bi's boyfriend
 Won Jong-rye as Byung-hoon's mother
 Jung Yi-yeon as Myung Sun-mi, nurse
 Choi Jae-ho as Ji Bang-kyu, hotel door attendant
 Hwang Hyo-eun as Ma Ye-soon, Seo family maid
 Kwon Min as Hwang Woo-bin, actor
 Seo Dong-soo as Director Kim
 Hong Seok-cheon as Director Hong
 Han Ji-hoo as Tae-sung
 Oh Mi-hee as Kyle's Korean stepmother
 Seol Woon-do as Seol Hwang-do
 Shin Shin-ae as Hye-ja's friend
 Choi Hyo-eun as Jae-eun
 Kim Kwang-kyu as plastic surgeon

Awards
2009 MBC Drama Awards
 Excellence Award, Actress: Go Na-eun
 Golden Acting Award, Actress in a Serial Drama: Kim Young-ok
 Golden Acting Award, Actress in a Serial Drama: Jung Hye-sun

References

External links
 Assorted Gems official MBC website 
 The Jewel Family at MBC Global Media
 
 

MBC TV television dramas
2009 South Korean television series debuts
2010 South Korean television series endings
Korean-language television shows
South Korean romance television series